Gayville, New York may refer to:

Gayville, Oswego County, New York, a hamlet
Gayville, Putnam County, New York, a hamlet